(born 1 March 1943, Setagaya, Tokyo), also known as Kato-chan, is a male Japanese comedian and actor. Cha is one of the members of The Drifters and plays drums. His work with Ken Shimura, another Drifter, is well known in Japan.
Many in Japan were surprised when it was announced in 2011 that he had married a woman 45 years younger than him (making her 22 years old).

TV programs
 Hachiji Dayo, Zen'inshugo! (1969–85) (with other members of The Drifters).
 Fun TV with Kato-chan and Ken-chan (with Ken Shimura).
 Dorifu Daibakusho (1977–98) (with other members of The Drifters).

External links
Kato-chan Page

1943 births
Living people
Japanese comedians
Japanese male actors
Japanese drummers
People from Tokyo